Will Hinchcliff (born September 13, 1969, in Trenton, New Jersey) is a former American football wide receiver in the Canadian Football League and the World League of American Football. A sprinter and a long jumper, Hinchcliff represented New Zealand in the 1990 Commonwealth Games in the long jump. However, he soon tested positive for steroid use and was suspended for two years. In addition to athletics, he also represented New Zealand in international bobsled competition. Hinchcliff is a nephew of former New Zealand Prime Minister Sir Geoffrey Palmer.

References

Living people
1969 births
American football wide receivers
Canadian football wide receivers
Canadian football return specialists
BC Lions players
Saskatchewan Roughriders players
Ottawa Rough Riders players
London Monarchs players
Athletes (track and field) at the 1990 Commonwealth Games
Commonwealth Games competitors for New Zealand
New Zealand male long jumpers
New Zealand male sprinters
New Zealand male bobsledders
New Zealand players of American football
New Zealand players of Canadian football
New Zealand sportspeople in doping cases
Doping cases in athletics
Players of American football from Trenton, New Jersey